Guy Forget and Henri Leconte were the defending champions, but Forget chose not to play this year. Leconte played alongside Arnaud Boetsch, but they were eliminated in the round-robin competition.

Sergi Bruguera and Goran Ivanišević won the title, defeating Yannick Noah and Cédric Pioline in the final, 6–3, 7–6(7–2).

Draw

Final

Group C
Standings are determined by: 1. number of wins; 2. number of matches; 3. in three-players-ties, percentage of sets won, or of games won; 4. steering-committee decision.

Group D
Standings are determined by: 1. number of wins; 2. number of matches; 3. in three-players-ties, percentage of sets won, or of games won; 4. steering-committee decision.

References

Legends Over 45 Doubles